Erechthias charadrota is a species of moth in the family Tineidae. It was described by Edward Meyrick in 1880 using three specimens caught in dry forest-scrub near Wellington and Port Lyttelton during the month of January. This species is endemic to New Zealand.

References

External links
Image of type specimen of Erechthias charadrota

Moths described in 1880
Erechthiinae
Moths of New Zealand
Endemic fauna of New Zealand
Taxa named by Edward Meyrick
Endemic moths of New Zealand